Since 1949 (except 1990–1996), Slovakia has been divided into a number of kraje (singular kraj; usually translated as "Regions" with capital R). Their number, borders and functions have been changed several times. There are eight regions of Slovakia and they correspond to the EU's NUTS 3 level of local administrative units. Each kraj consists of okresy (counties or districts). There are 79 districts.

List 
After a period without kraje and without any equivalent (1990–1996), the kraje were reintroduced in 1996. As for administrative division, Slovakia has been subdivided into 8 kraje since 24 July 1996:

Since 2002, Slovakia is divided into 8 samosprávne kraje (self-governing regions), which are  called by the Constitution vyššie územné celky (Higher Territorial Units), abbr. VÚC. The territory and borders of the self-governing regions are identical with the territory and borders of the kraje. Therefore, the word "kraj" can be replaced by "VÚC" or "samosprávny kraj" in each case in the above list. The main difference is that organs of samosprávne kraje are self-governing, with an elected chairperson and 
assembly, while the organs of kraje are appointed by the government.

Name 
The term "Region" should not  be confused with:
 the general (i.e. non-administrative) term "region" as it is used for example in the articles List of traditional regions of Slovakia or List of tourism regions of Slovakia
These are:
Bratislava SK 01 (Bratislava Region)comprises only this single kraj
Západné Slovensko SK 02 (Western Slovakia)Trnava,  Trenčín and Nitra
Stredné Slovensko SK 03 (Central Slovakia)Žilina and Banská Bystrica
Východné Slovensko SK 04 (Eastern Slovakia)Prešov and Košice

History

Prior to 1949 
Historically, Slovakia was not divided into kraje, but into counties (Slovak: župy or stolice). This was the case when present-day Slovakia was part of:
Great Moravia (cca. 9th century) 
the Kingdom of Hungary (cca. 11th / 12th century1918)
Czechoslovakia (the župy existed 19181928)
the WWII Slovak Republic (the župy existed  19401945)

In 1928–1939 (and formally also 1945–1948) Slovakia as a whole formed the administrative unit "Slovak land" (Krajina slovenská) within Czechoslovakia.

24 December 1948/1 January 1949 – 30 June 1960 
Bratislavský kraj (Bratislava Region)
Banskobystrický kraj (Banská Bystrica Region)
Košický kraj (Košice Region)
Nitriansky kraj (Nitra Region)
Prešovský kraj (Prešov Region)
Žilinský kraj (Žilina Region)

Each kraj was named after its principal city.

July 1, 1960 – December 19, 1990 
 Stredoslovenský kraj (Central Slovak Region)
 Východoslovenský kraj (Eastern Slovak Region)
 Západoslovenský kraj (Western Slovak Region)
 Bratislava (before March 22, 1968, part of the Západoslovenský kraj, afterwards a partly separate entity; from January 1971 a separate kraj)

Note: The kraje were abolished from July 1, 1969, to December 28, 1970, and reintroduced then.

See also 
List of traditional regions of Slovakia
List of tourism regions of Slovakia
Districts of Slovakia
Counties of Slovakia
Flags of Slovak Regions
ISO 3166-2:SK

References

External links 
EU-maps (the kraje correspond to the NUTS 3 level with EUROSTAT)
 Former names of all Slovakia´s towns and villages prior IWW (prior 1918)
 Nature and lanscsape of Eastern Slovakia in photo 

 
Subdivisions of Slovakia
Slovakia, Regions
Slovakia 1
Regions, Slovakia
Slovakia geography-related lists